Root Township is one of twelve townships in Adams County, Indiana. As of the 2010 census, its population was 4,443.

Geography

Cities, towns, villages
 Decatur (north quarter)

Unincorporated towns
 Monmouth
 Williams

Adjacent townships
 Madison Township, Allen County (north)
 Monroe Township, Allen County (northeast)
 Union Township (east)
 St. Marys Township (southeast)
 Washington Township (south)
 Kirkland Township (southwest)
 Preble Township (west)
 Marion Township, Allen County (northwest)

Cemeteries
The township contains these cemeteries: Alpha, Evans Family, Kunkel Family, Monmouth, Pleasant Valley, Reynolds, St. Joseph Catholic, St. Peter Lutheran, Union Chapel Methodist and United Brethren.

Major highways

Lakes
 Saddle Lake

Landmarks
 Hanna City Park

School districts
 North Adams Community Schools

Political districts
 Indiana's 6th congressional district
 State House District 79
 State Senate District 19

References
 
 United States Census Bureau 2007 TIGER/Line Shapefiles
 United States National Atlas

External links
 Indiana Township Association
 United Township Association of Indiana

Townships in Adams County, Indiana
Townships in Indiana